

Survivors

France
Airworthy
AD-4N
124143 - Jean Baptiste Salis. Damaged during a mid-air collision with P-51 Mustang "Big Beautiful Doll" at IWM Duxford's Flying Legends Airshow in July 2011. The P-51 was destroyed (pilot parachuted safely), and Skyraider 124143 suffered extensive damage to its right wing, but landed safely.
125716 - Didier Chable.
AD-4NA
127002 - Michele Gineste and Maurice Etchetto in Le Havre, France.
On display
AD-4NA
126979 - Musée de l'Air et de l'Espace.

Sweden
On display
AD-4W
127947 - Arlandasamlingarna, Stockholm-Arlanda Airport. Svensk Flygtjänst target tug, SE-EBB. Former Fleet Air Arm Skyraider AEW.1, WT949.
127960 - Svedinos Bil- och Flygmuseum, Ugglarp. Currently undergoing restoration but available to visitors. Target tug used by Svensk Flygtjänst, as SE-EBC. Decommissioned in 1974 and acquired by Svedinos the same year. Former Fleet Air Arm Skyraider AEW.1, WT962.

In storage
AD-4W
127945 - Owned by Flygvapenmuseum but on loan to Skyraider AB, Karlskoga, for restoration.  Former Fleet Air Arm Skyraider AEW.1, WV185. Used by Svensk Flygtjänst as target tug 1963-1973, registration SE-EBI. Decommissioned in 1974 and acquired by Flygvapenmuseum the same year, though never put on display.

Thailand

On display
AD-7
142072 - Royal Thai Air Force Museum.

United Kingdom
Airworthy
AD-4NA
126922 - Kennet Aviation.
In storage
AD-4W
124086 (WV106) - in storage (incomplete) at the Royal Navy's Fleet Air Arm Museum ('Cobham Hall'), visible from outside.
124121 (WT121) - in storage at the Fleet Air Arm Museum's 'Cobham hall'

United States

Airworthy
AD-1
9257 - based at the Warbird Heritage Foundation in Waukegan, Illinois.
AD-4
123827 - based at the Military Aviation Museum in Virginia Beach, Virginia.
126997 - privately owned in Houston, Texas.
AD-4N (A-1D)
124156 - privately owned in Troy, Alabama.
126959 - privately owned in Bennett, Iowa.
AD-4NA (A-1D)
126882 - based at the Lone Star Flight Museum in Houston, Texas.  The aircraft survived Hurricane Ike without damage as it was flown out before the storm.
126965 - based at the Heritage Flight Museum in Burlington, Washington. It has a Wright R-3350-26WA with 2,700 hp. The cease-fire was called before it saw combat action, however, the aircraft of VA-115 conducted DMZ patrols for the duration of the cruise. When it returned stateside it was stationed with FASRON 8 at NAS Alameda before transitioning to FAETULANT at NAS Norfolk, VA from November 1954 until August 1955.
AD-4W
126867 - based at the Erickson Aircraft Collection in Madras, Oregon.

AD-5 (A-1E)

132683 - based at the National Museum of World War II Aviation in Colorado Springs, Colorado.
AD-5W (EA-1E)
135152 - based at the Cavanaugh Flight Museum in Addison, Texas.
135178 - privately owned in Saint Charles, Missouri.
135188 - based at the Collings Foundation in Stow, Massachusetts. It was donated to the Collings Foundation in May 2012.
AD-6 (A-1H)
139606 -  based at the Cavanaugh Flight Museum in Addison, Texas.
139665 - based at the Tennessee Museum of Aviation in Sevierville, Tennessee.
On display
XBT2D-1 (AD-1)
9102 - Intrepid Sea, Air & Space Museum in New York, New York.
AD-3
122811 - Naval Inventory Control Point (NAVICP) in Philadelphia, Pennsylvania.
AD-4N (A-1D)
127007 -  at the Patriot's Point Naval and Maritime Museum in Mount Pleasant, South Carolina. It bears the markings of Attack Squadron 65 (VA-65), assigned to Carrier Air Group TWO (CVG-2), aboard Yorktown, circa 1953-54.
AD-4NA (A-1D)

125739 - United States Naval Museum of Armament and Technology, NAWS China Lake (North) in Ridgecrest, California.
126924 - Yanks Air Museum in Chino, California.
127888 - Air Zoo in Kalamazoo, Michigan.
AD-4W
127922 -  at the San Diego Aircraft Carrier Museum, in San Diego, California. According to the curators, the aircraft is actually an AD-4W that was modified to resemble an A-1 for museum display purposes.  Former Fleet Air Arm Skyraider AEW.1, WT981, later Svensk Flygtjänst target tug, as SE-EBL. Decommissioned in 1976 and acquired by Flygvapenmuseum. Sold to David Talichet in 1983, as N5469Y, later donated to the National Warplane Museum. On display in San Diego since 2006.
AD-4B
132261 - Naval Air Station Fallon in Nevada.
AD-5 (A-1E)
132463 - Aerospace Museum of California at the former McClellan Air Force Base in North Highlands, California.
52-132649 (former bureau number 132649) - National Museum of the United States Air Force at Wright-Patterson AFB in Dayton, Ohio. This aircraft was originally a US Navy aircraft. Transferred to USAF, it was flown by then-Major Bernard Francis Fisher (Colonel, USAF Retired) on 10 March 1966 when he rescued a fellow A-1E pilot shot down over South Vietnam in the midst of enemy troops, a deed for which he was awarded the Medal of Honor. The aircraft was severely damaged in combat in South Vietnam and was returned in 1967 for preservation by the then-US Air Force Museum.  It is the only surviving US Air Force Medal of Honor Aircraft.
52-247 - Hill Aerospace Museum at Hill AFB in Roy, Utah.  It is an A-1E that was apparently remanufactured from various components taken from several other A-1s (both Air Force and Navy versions) in South Vietnam.
AD-5N (A-1G)
132534 - Evergreen Aviation & Space Museum in McMinnville, Oregon.
52-598 (former bureau number 132598) - Hurlburt Field Memorial Air Park, Hurlburt Field, Florida (USA).
AD-5W (EA-1E)
132443 - Historic Aviation Memorial Museum, Tyler Pounds Field (East Side) in Tyler, Texas.
132789 - March Field Air Museum, March AFB (former) in Riverside, California.
AD-5Q (EA-1F)
132532 - National Museum of Naval Aviation at NAS Pensacola, Florida.
135018 - Pima Air and Space Museum adjacent to Davis-Monthan AFB in Tucson, Arizona.  The aircraft is painted in the markings of VAW-33 as embarked with Carrier Air Wing 6 (CVW-6) aboard the aircraft carrier  in 1967.
AD-6 (A-1H)
135300 - National Museum of Naval Aviation at NAS Pensacola, Florida. This aircraft is painted in the markings of Attack Squadron 25 (VA-25).
137602 - on a pylon near the near base headquarters and the base chapel at NAS Lemoore, California.  This aircraft is also painted in the same markings as the NAS Pensacola museum aircraft, i.e., Attack Squadron 25 (VA-25) and a "false" BuNo of 135300.
Under restoration or in storage
AD-4W
126867 - in storage at the Erickson Aircraft Collection in Madras, Oregon.
AD-6 (A-1H)
134600 - for display at the National Museum of the United States Air Force at Wright-Patterson AFB in Dayton, Ohio.
135332 - in storage at the National Air and Space Museum of the Smithsonian Institution in Washington D.C.

Vietnam
On display
A-1E
132436 - Viet Nam Military History Museum in Ha Noi.
A-1H
134636 - Viet Nam Military History Museum in Ha Noi.
139674 - War Remnants Museum in Ho Chi Minh City.
139723 - Vietnam People's Air Force Museum, Hanoi.

References
Notes

Bibliography

Lists of surviving military aircraft